Besart is a given name. Notable people with the name include:

Besart Abdurahimi (born 1990), Macedonian footballer
Besart Berisha (born 1985), Kosovar-Albanian footballer
Besart Ibraimi (born 1986), Macedonian footballer
Besart Veseli (born 1992), Kosovan footballer

See also
Beart (disambiguation)